Northern Yearly Meeting (NYM) is a Yearly Meeting of the Religious Society of Friends (Quakers).  It is affiliated with the Friends General Conference.  The Northern Yearly Meeting consists of meetings and worship groups from the upper midwest of The United States, with member groups in Iowa, Michigan, Minnesota, North Dakota, and Wisconsin.

The Annual Sessions of the Yearly Meeting are held over Memorial Day weekend, historically in Wisconsin.

History 

Northern Yearly Meeting started as Northern Half-Yearly Meeting in 1960.  Around 1975 the group became Northern Yearly Meeting around due to increased membership.

Meetings Affiliated with the Northern Yearly Meeting 

Beloit Friends Meeting
Bismarck-Mandan Religious Society of Friends (Quakers)
Brainerd Friends Meeting,
Cannon Valley Friends Meeting
Dodgeville Friends Worship Group
Dubuque Friends Worship Group
Duluth-Superior Friends Meeting
Eau Claire Friends Meeting
Fox Valley Friends Meeting
Grand Rapids Friends Worship Group
Interlake Friends Meeting
Keweenaw Friends Meeting
Kenosha-Racine Friends Worship Group
Kickapoo Valley Friends Meeting
La Crosse Friends Worship Group
Lake Superior Friends Meeting,
Madison Friends Meeting
Menomonie Friends Meeting
Milwaukee Friends Meeting
Minneapolis Friends Meeting
North Central Wisconsin Friends Worship Group
Northern Light Preparative Meeting
Northern Pines Worship Group
Oshkosh Friends Meeting
Prospect Hill Friends Meeting
Red River Friends Monthly Meeting
Richland Friends Worship Group
Rochester Friends Meeting
Saint Croix Valley Friends Meeting
Sand Ridge Friends Worship Group
South Dakota Friends
Stevens Point Friends Meeting
Twin Cities Friends Meeting
West Side Worship Group
Willmar Friends Worship Group
Winnebago Friends Worship Group
Winona Friends Preparatory Meeting

External links
 Northern Yearly Meeting Official Website

Footnotes 

Quaker yearly meetings
Quakerism in the United States
Annual events in the United States